is a 2016 Japanese action/comedy film directed by Teruyuki Yoshida based on the novel by Keigo Higashino. The movie was produced by Kazuma Kuryu and Takako Oki. Its release date was November 26, 2016. By the first screenings, the film had earned ¥103 million (US$0.917 million).

Storyline 
An employee of a University, of his own accord, creates a bio weapon (named "weapon K-55"). Upon being sacked for creating the weapon, he steals it from the laboratory. The university faces a challenge in that they can't contact the police, due to the weapon being created against protocol. The University laboratory then receives a message that the weapon will be deployed and used on the nation of Japan unless a huge ransom is paid. The laboratory staff agonises over what to do, but finally the manager of the lab,  Akira Emoto selects one of the lab managers and senior researchers,  Kazuyuki Kuribayashi (played by Hiroshi Abe) to try to retrieve the stolen bio weapon. Kazuyuki, a single father already dealing with family problems mainly caused by his son, also has to deal with the challenge of how to conduct a covert mission with no training. The extra challenge is, the weapon is hidden somewhere in a Ski Resort and Kazuyuki can't ski and is generally not athletic.  Once at the resort, he forms an alliance with a local snowboarder Yuko Oshima and resort employee (Tadayoshi Okura) and with his son, tackles the challenge of finding the weapon.

Cast
 Hiroshi Abe as Kazuyuki Kuribayashi
 Tadayoshi Okura
 Yuko Oshima 
 Akira Emoto 
 Taiyō Yoshizawa 
 Tatsuomi Hamada
 Keiko Horiuchi
 Yumi Asō
 Tsuyoshi Muro
 Shigeyuki Totsugi

References 

2016 comedy films
2010s Japanese-language films
Films based on works by Keigo Higashino
2010s Japanese films